The 1981 Cleveland Indians season was the franchise's 81st season as a member of the American League. Games were suspended for 50 days due to the 1981 Major League Baseball strike, causing a split season. The Indians finished the first half of the season in sixth place in the American League East, and the second half of the season tied for fifth place. Managed by Dave Garcia, the Indians played their home games at Cleveland Stadium and had an overall record of 52 wins and 51 losses.

Offseason 
 December 8, 1980: Dan Spillner was signed as a free agent by the Indians.
 December 9, 1980: Gary Alexander, Víctor Cruz, Rafael Vásquez, and Bob Owchinko were traded by the Indians to the Pittsburgh Pirates for Bert Blyleven and Manny Sanguillén.

Regular season 
 May 15, 1981: Len Barker pitched a perfect game against the Toronto Blue Jays. It was the 10th perfect game in MLB history, and remains the most recent no-hitter thrown by an Indian. Barker was later selected to the All-Star Game.

Season standings

Record vs. opponents

Opening Day Lineup

Roster

Player stats

Batting
Note: G = Games played; AB = At bats; R = Runs scored; H = Hits; 2B = Doubles; 3B = Triples; HR = Home runs; RBI = Runs batted in; AVG = Batting average; SB = Stolen bases

Pitching
Note: W = Wins; L = Losses; ERA = Earned run average; G = Games pitched; GS = Games started; SV = Saves; IP = Innings pitched; R = Runs allowed; ER = Earned runs allowed; BB = Walks allowed; K = Strikeouts

Awards and honors 

All-Star Game
 Len Barker, reserve

Farm system

Notes

References 
1981 Cleveland Indians at Baseball Reference
1981 Cleveland Indians at Baseball Almanac

Cleveland Guardians seasons
Cleveland Indians season
Cleve